The North Cape York Paman languages are a subdivision of the Paman languages consisting of forty languages, all spoken on the Cape York Peninsula of Queensland, Australia. The languages are grouped largely according to R. M. W. Dixon. The only extant branches of this family are Umpila and the Wik languages. The now-extinct Northern Paman branch was unique among Pama-Nyungan languages in containing fricatives. 

The languages are,
 Northern Paman
 Anguthimri (incl. dialects Alngith, Linngithigh) †
 Gudang (alt. Djagaraga) †
 Uradhi (incl. Atampaya, Yinwum, Wuthati) †
 Luthigh (Mpalityan) †
 Awngthim †
 Ndra'ngith †
 Ngkoth †
 Arritinngithigh †
 Adithinngithigh †
 Mbiywom †
 Andjingith †
 Umpila (= Northeastern Paman, several dialects)
 Wik languages (Middle Paman) (See)

Sutton (2001) also distinguishes a Ndwa'ngith language among Northern Paman.

References 

 
Indigenous Australian languages in Queensland